The 1914–15 Ottawa Senators season was the Ottawa Hockey Club's 30th season of play since its founding in 1883 (with some inactive years in the 1880s). After placing fourth in 1913–14, the Senators improved to win the NHA title, but lost the Stanley Cup 'World Series' playoff to the Vancouver Millionaires, played in Vancouver.

Team business
The Senators traded Percy LeSueur to the Ontarios for Fred Lake.

Regular season

Final standings

Schedule and results

Source: Coleman, pp. 272–273.

Scoring leaders

Goaltending averages

Playoffs

League championship
Montreal and Ottawa played a two-game total-goals series to determine the league championship and the O'Brien Cup.

Stanley Cup Final

As the 1914 Final was held in Toronto, all three games in this series were played at the arena of the PCHA's champion in Vancouver, British Columbia. The Millionaires swept the best-of-five series in three games.

See also
1914–15 NHA season

References

 
 

Ottawa Senators season
Ottawa Senators (original) seasons